Restarter is a 2015 album by Torche.

Restarter may also refer to:
Restarter, a module that restarts services in the Solaris Service Management Facility
Restarters, failed entrepreneurs who attempt to launch a subsequent startup company

See also
 Restart (disambiguation)
 Starter (disambiguation)
 Start (disambiguation)